Brenda Gullett owns a corporate training company and served in the Arkansas House of Representatives and Arkansas Senate. She lives in Fayetteville, Arkansas. She lived in Pine Bluff, Arkansas.

References

People from Pine Bluff, Arkansas
Politicians from Fayetteville, Arkansas
Members of the Arkansas House of Representatives
Arkansas state senators

Year of birth missing (living people)
Living people